Januarius Kyunosuke Hayasaka (August 14, 1883 – October 26, 1976) was a bishop of the Catholic Church of Showa from Meiji. His baptismal name was "Yanuario".

Hayasaka was the first Japanese-ethnicity bishop. He served as a diocesan bishop Nagasaki. His brother Kyube Hayasaka also served as bishop of the Diocese Daegu in Korea.

External links
 Bishop Januarius Kyunosuke Hayasaka - Catholic-Hierarchy

1883 births
1976 deaths
People from Sendai
20th-century Roman Catholic bishops in Japan
Japanese Roman Catholic bishops